Loch Lundie is a small, lowland freshwater loch in Glen Garry, about  north-west of Invergarry in the Scottish Highlands. The loch was surveyed in 1903 by Sir John Murray and James Murray as part of the Bathymetrical Survey of Fresh-Water Lochs of Scotland 1897-1909.

References 

Lundie
Lundie